Jamil Siebert (born 2 April 2002) is a German professional footballer who plays as a centre-back for Viktoria Köln on loan from Fortuna Düsseldorf.

Career
Siebert made his professional debut for Fortuna Düsseldorf on 26 September 2020, coming on as a substitute in second-half stoppage time of the team's 1–0 home win against Würzburger Kickers.

On 31 January 2022, Siebert joined Viktoria Köln on loan until the end of the season. The loan was extended for the 2022–23 season.

References

External links
 
 
 
 

2002 births
Living people
Footballers from Düsseldorf
German footballers
Association football central defenders
Germany youth international footballers
2. Bundesliga players
Regionalliga players
3. Liga players
Fortuna Düsseldorf players
Fortuna Düsseldorf II players
FC Viktoria Köln players